Anything to Declare? is a 1957 detective novel by Freeman Wills Crofts.  It is the twenty ninth and final entry in his series of novels featuring Inspector French, a prominent figure of the Golden Age of Detective Fiction. The author had been in poor health for much of the decade, and struggled to finish this book which was published a few weeks before his death.

References

Bibliography
 Evans, Curtis. Masters of the "Humdrum" Mystery: Cecil John Charles Street, Freeman Wills Crofts, Alfred Walter Stewart and the British Detective Novel, 1920-1961. McFarland, 2014.
 Herbert, Rosemary. Whodunit?: A Who's Who in Crime & Mystery Writing. Oxford University Press, 2003.
 Reilly, John M. Twentieth Century Crime & Mystery Writers. Springer, 2015.

1957 British novels
Novels by Freeman Wills Crofts
British crime novels
British mystery novels
British thriller novels
British detective novels
Hodder & Stoughton books
Novels set in England
Irish mystery novels
Irish crime novels